The 1966 Latin Cup was the 2nd edition of the Latin Cup. It took place at Pabellón de la Ciudad Deportiva del Real Madrid, Madrid, Spain, on 24, 25 and 26 December 1966  with the participations of Simmenthal Milano (champions of the 1965–66 FIBA European Champions Cup, Real Madrid (champions of the 1965–66 Liga Española de Baloncesto), ASVEL (champions of the 1965–66 Nationale 1) and Benfica (champions of the 1964–65 Liga Portuguesa de Basquetebol).

League stage
Day 1, December 24, 1966,

Day 2, December 25, 1966,

Day 3, December 26, 1966

References

Latin Cup (basketball)
1966–67 in European basketball
1966–67 in Spanish basketball
1966–67 in Italian basketball
1966–67 in French basketball
International basketball competitions hosted by Spain